Sun Dan (born 18 January 1985) is a Chinese former swimmer who competed in the 2000 Summer Olympics.

References

1985 births
Living people
Chinese female freestyle swimmers
Olympic swimmers of China
Swimmers at the 2000 Summer Olympics
Medalists at the FINA World Swimming Championships (25 m)